Marija Vrajić Trošić (born 23 September 1976) is a Croatian marathoner and ultra marathoner. In 2015, she took bronze at the IAU 100 km World Championships.

She was the winner of the 2009 Skopje Marathon and the 2012 Three Hearts Marathon.

In 2015, she took third by 3 seconds in the Three Hearts Marathon with a time of 2:44:57, and qualified for the 2016 Summer Olympics.

Personal bests

 Marathon: 2:40:41 (Treviso, 6 March 2016)
 100 km: 7:27:11 (Winschoten, 12 September 2015)
 24 hours: 233.460 km (Albi, 26–27 October 2019)

References

External links
 
 
 

Living people
1976 births
Croatian female marathon runners
Croatian female long-distance runners
Athletes (track and field) at the 2016 Summer Olympics
Olympic athletes of Croatia
20th-century Croatian women
21st-century Croatian women